Chlorine peroxide (also known as dichlorine dioxide or  ClO dimer) is a molecular compound with formula ClOOCl. Chemically, it is a dimer of the chlorine monoxide radical (ClO·).  It is important in the formation of the ozone hole. Chlorine peroxide catalytically converts ozone into oxygen when it is irradiated by ultraviolet light.

Production
Chlorine peroxide can be produced by laser or ultraviolet photolysis of the chlorine molecule with ozone. The lasers used to break up the chlorine molecule into atoms can be an excimer laser at 248, 308, or 352 nm wavelength. Difluorodichloromethane (CF2Cl2) can also act as a source of chlorine atoms for the formation of the peroxide. Microwave discharge can also break up chlorine molecules into atoms that react with ozone to make chlorine peroxide.

Cl2 + hν → 2Cl
Cl + O3 →  O2 + ClO· 
2ClO· + M → ClOOCl + M
ClOOCl + hν → Cl + ClO2
ClO2 + M → Cl + O2 + M

Properties
Chlorine peroxide absorbs ultraviolet light with a maximum absorbing wavelength of 245 nm.  It also absorbs longer wavelengths up to 350 nm to a lesser extent. This is important as ozone absorbs up to 300 nm.

The Cl−O bond length is 1.704 Å, and the O−O bond is 1.426 Å long. The ClOO bond angle is 110.1°, and the dihedral angle between the two Cl−O−O planes is 81°

References

Peroxides
Chlorine oxides